The 2002–03 season was Motherwell's 5th season in the Scottish Premier League, and their 18th consecutive season in the top division of Scottish football. They finished the season in bottom of the league, but were spared relegation as Falkirk, the champions of the 2002–03 Scottish First Division, ground did not meet SPL stadium criteria. They also competed in the Scottish Cup, reaching the Semi-Finals before being defeated by Rangers, and the League Cup, losing to Aberdeen.

Squad

Transfers

In

Loans in

Out

Loans out

Released

Competitions

Premier League

Results summary

Results by round

Results

Table

Scottish Cup

League Cup

Squad statistics

Appearances

 

|-
|colspan="14"|Players away on loan:

|-
|colspan="14"|Players who appeared for Motherwell but left during the season:

|}

Goal scorers

Clean sheets

Disciplinary record

See also
 List of Motherwell F.C. seasons

References

2002-03
Scottish football clubs 2002–03 season